Synopsis Chronike may refer to:

 Synopsis Chronike of Constantine Manasses, 12th century 
 Synopsis Chronike (Skoutariotes), 13th century, attributed to Theodore Skoutariotes